Hood River County is one of the 36 counties in the U.S. state of Oregon. As of the 2020 census, the population was 23,977. The county seat is Hood River. The county was established in 1908 and is named for the Hood River, a tributary of the Columbia River. Hood River County comprises the Hood River, OR Micropolitan Statistical Area. The Hood River Valley produces apples, pears, and cherries. Situated between Mount Hood and the Columbia River in the middle of the Columbia River Gorge, Hood River County is a popular destination for outdoor enthusiasts, such as windsurfers, mountain-bikers, skiers, hikers, kayakers, and many more.

History
The first permanent settlers in present-day Hood River County filed a donation land claim in 1854. The first school was built in 1863 and a road from The Dalles was completed in 1867. By 1880 there were 17 families living in the valley. By the latter part of the nineteenth century farmers of Japanese, Finnish, German, and French ethnicity had settled in the valley.

At the turn of the twentieth century, the people of the Hood River region in the northwest portion of Wasco County expressed a desire for political separation from the parent county. The passage of a statewide initiative established Hood River as the thirty-fourth county of the state. It was made official by a governor's proclamation on June 23, 1908. The Columbia River Highway was completed in 1922 from Portland to The Dalles, improving access between both those cities as well as to Hood River.

In response to controversy surrounding county approval of locating a destination resort at Cooper Spur ski area on Mount Hood, on November 5, 2003 62% of the voters approved a measure requiring voter approval on residential developments of 25 units or more on land zoned for forest use. Opponents claimed that this measure was not enforceable and would end up in court.

Geography
It is the second-smallest county in Oregon by area.

The County lies in a transition zone in the Columbia River Gorge between the temperate rain forest of the Cascade range and dry desert of eastern Oregon. Precipitation varies considerably by longitude and elevation. Annual precipitation averages over 76 inches in Cascade Locks, but is less than 31 inches in the City of Hood River. At the highest reaches of the County on Mount Hood precipitation can be up to 150 inches annually.

The Gorge can have a moderating effect on air temperatures in the County near the Columbia River when maritime air moves in from the west. Major easterly flows, however, can occasionally cause extreme cold conditions as cold air moves west through the Gorge. Winds are generally from the west in the summer, resulting in strong and consistent winds on the Columbia River at Hood River County, making Hood River a world-renowned wind surfing location. Winter winds can blow from either the east or the west and can be of sufficient force to result in widespread damage.

Hood River County contains the entirety of the  Hood River watershed, which covers nearly two-thirds of the county. This watershed includes four main sub-basins: the West Fork Hood River, the Middle Fork Hood River, the East Fork Hood River, and the Hood River Mainstem (the lower river and its tributaries).

Another , or 8.8 percent, is forestland owned and managed by Hood River County. The State of Oregon owns  within the County. Weyerhaeuser Company became a major private landowner in 2013 after purchasing Longview Timber LLC, including its forest holdings in Hood River County. , over seven percent of the County, is managed as private farmland.

Adjacent counties

 Skamania County, Washington - north
 Klickitat County, Washington - northeast
 Wasco County - southeast
 Clackamas County - southwest
 Multnomah County - west

National protected areas
Badger Creek Wilderness
Mark O. Hatfield Wilderness
Mount Hood Wilderness
Columbia River Gorge National Scenic Area

Demographics

2000 census
At the time of the census 11.8 percent of a total of 9,271 housing units were vacant. Of the 8,173 occupied housing units, 62.9 percent were owner-occupied.

Median household income was $51,307 and median income for a family was $57,644. As of the 2010 census 2,235 persons, or 10.1 percent of the population, lived in poverty.

Of the 20,258 people in the population that are five years and older, 25.6 percent  speak Spanish or Spanish Creole, and 69 percent of this group speak English less than "very well."

2010 census
As of the 2010 census, there were 22,346 people, 8,173 households, and 5,659 families residing in the county. The racial makeup of the county was 83.1% white, 1.4% Asian, 0.8% American Indian, 0.5% black or African American, 0.2% Pacific islander, 10.9% from other races, and 3.2% from two or more races. Those of Hispanic or Latino origin made up 29.5% of the population. In terms of ancestry, 16.7% were German, 10.6% were English, 9.8% were Irish, and 3.8% were American.

Of the 8,173 households, 35.9% had children under the age of 18 living with them, 55.4% were married couples living together, 9.3% had a female householder with no husband present, 30.8% were non-families, and 23.8% of all households were made up of individuals. The average household size was 2.64 and the average family size was 3.14. The median age was 38.0 years.

The median income for a household in the county was $51,307 and the median income for a family was $57,644. Males had a median income of $37,901 versus $31,516 for females. The per capita income for the county was $23,930. About 7.5% of families and 9.5% of the population were below the poverty line, including 9.6% of those under age 18 and 9.1% of those age 65 or over.

Communities

Cities
 Cascade Locks
 Hood River (county seat)

Census-designated places
 Mount Hood
 Odell
 Parkdale

Unincorporated communities

 Clifton
 Dee
 Lenz
 Oak Grove
 Pine Grove
 Rockford
 Summit
 Trout Creek
 Winans
 Wyeth

Historical communities
 Bloucher
 Conway
 Dukes Valley
 Holstein
 Viento

Government and infrastructure
Hood River is a home rule county with an administrative style of government. The county is governed by an elected board of five commissioners. Four commissioners are elected from four geographic districts, and the Chair is elected at large.

The County operates two campgrounds at Toll Bridge Park and Tucker Park. The Forestry Department manages the 31,000 acre County Forest for timber sale revenue and to develop and maintain recreation trails. In fiscal year 2014 gross revenue from County timber sales was $3,851,646 while Forestry Department expenses where $1,049,648. Property taxes generated $3,071,038 in revenue in the same year.

The Northern Oregon Regional Corrections Facility (Norcor), a short-term jail, serves Hood River, Gilliam, Sherman, and Wasco counties.

In presidential elections, while formerly a Republican-leaning county, Hood River County has been reliably Democratic since 1988.

Presidential elections

Economy

Health Care and Social Assistance was the largest major NAICS industry sector in Hood River County in 2013, with 14 percent of earnings. Manufacturing, at 12 percent, was the second largest sector. Farm Earnings combined with Forestry, Fishing and Related Activities represented nearly 11 percent of earnings. The Professional, Scientific, and Technical Services sector, while accounting for seven percent of earnings in 2013, was the fastest growing sector between 2002 and 2013, growing at an average annual rate of over 11 percent, and increasing its relative share of total earnings by 6.45 percent. Earnings in the Health Care and Social Assistance sector grew at an average of over five percent per year during that period.

Despite a relatively small share of total earnings, farming, forestry and tourism are all important economic drivers in Hood River County. In 2013, Farm Earnings and Forestry, Fishing and Related Activities had location quotients of 8.57 percent and 12.09 percent, respectively, indicating an outsized concentration of these sectors within the County. The Arts, Entertainment, and Recreation industry, while comprising less than four percent of total earnings, had a location quotient of 3.27 percent, the highest of any county in the State of Oregon, indicating a highly concentrated tourism sector.

Agriculture, timber, lumber and recreation are important sources of revenue and industry. Fruit grown in the fertile valley is of such exceptional quality the county leads the world in Anjou pear production. A 1997 census recorded  of commercial orchards growing pears, apples, cherries and peaches. Hood River County also has two ports and two boat basins, one serving local barge traffic, a steel boat manufacturing firm and Mid-Columbia yachting interests.

The Columbia River, which runs right by the city of Hood River, has become a premier windsurfing destination, attracting windsurfers from throughout the United States and around the world. Cool, moist coastal air is drawn through the Columbia River Gorge as the desert to the east heats up on warm days, creating winds between 15-35 knots most days in the summer.  With the current in the Columbia River flowing from east to west, and the wind blowing from west to east, large swells are created on the river that windsurfers enjoy riding like waves.  Windsurfing has affected the local economy in many ways: windsurfing-oriented businesses and upscale restaurants catering to visiting windsurfers have reinvigorated the downtown area, many people who first visited Hood River in search of wind and waves have settled in the area and become an integral part of the community, and the local economy has been infused with much needed tourist dollars.

The Mount Hood Railroad provides freight service, connecting with the Union Pacific at Hood River, Oregon, and operates excursion trains and dinner trains on a  rail line running from Hood River to Parkdale. The line was completed in 1909, and operated as an independent company until acquired by Union Pacific Railroad in 1968. In 1987 a local group of investors purchased the line for $600,000, naming it the Mount Hood Railroad. In 2008 Mount Hood Railroad was acquired by Iowa Pacific Holdings, based in Chicago. The company leases storage on its lines for excess freight cars, in addition to, or at times in place of, operating recreational rides.

See also

 National Register of Historic Places listings in Hood River County, Oregon

Notes

External links
 Hood River County, Oregon (official website)
 Hood River County listing in the Oregon Blue Book

References

 
1908 establishments in Oregon
Populated places established in 1908
Columbia River Gorge